Buluqhan Khatun, also Bulughan, Bulukhan, Bolgana, Bulugan, Zibeline or Bolghara for Marco Polo, was a 13th-century Mongol princess, and the principal wife of the Mongol Ilkhanid ruler Abaqa (1234–1282).

Life 
She belonged to the Mongol tribe of the Bayaut (also Baya'ud, Chinese: 伯牙吾). She was married to Abaqa Khan as his ninth wife. As a khatun, she was very influential in court. She saved a vizier's life in September 1282 once. She was wed to Arghun in levirate marriage after Abaqa's death in 1282. Her influence even reached to Tekudar's court, who treated her with due respect.

Family 
She had Malika Khatun with Abaqa, who was married to Tohjam Buqa, son of Nogai Yarghuchi. Though sonless herself, she raised her step-grandsons (by Abaqa's son Arghun) Ghazan and Öljeitü, both of whom later succeeded Arghun, and eventually converted to Islam. Arghun had Öljeitü baptized at birth, and gave him the name "Nicholas" after Pope Nicholas IV.

Death and aftermath 
She died on 20 April 1286 by the Kor River. After her death, Arghun asked Kublai Khan to send him one of Bulughan's relatives as a new bride. The choice fell to Kökötchin ("Blue, or Celestial, Dame"), who was escorted by Marco Polo on her journey from Kaan-baligh (Beijing).  The party traveled by sea, departing from the southern port city of Quanzhou and sailing to Sumatra, and then to Persia, via Sri Lanka and India. They arrived in 1293; however, Arghun had been killed before her arrival by conspirators, so Kökötchin married Arghun's son Ghazan, becoming his principal wife.

There were other Buluqhan Khatun who was married to Arghun after her death.

Notes

 
13th-century Mongolian women
Princesses
Women of the Mongol Empire
1286 deaths
Year of birth unknown